Theorema sapho is a Neotropical butterfly in the family Lycaenidae. It is found in Colombia.

References

Theclinae